{{Infobox award
| name         = 2021 ICC Awards
| image        = 
| caption      = 
| date         = 23–24 January 2022
| presenter    = ICC
| website      = 
| award1_type  = Cricketer of the Year
| award1_winner= Men's:  Shaheen Afridi  Women's:  Smriti Mandhana| award2_type  = Men's Test Cricketer of the Year
| award2_winner=  Joe Root
| award3_type  = ODI Cricketer of the Year
| award3_winner= Men's:  Babar Azam Women's:  Lizelle Lee
| award4_type  = T20I Cricketer of the Year
| award4_winner= Men's:  Mohammad Rizwan Women's:  Tammy Beaumont
| award5_type  = Emerging Cricketer of the Year
| award5_winner= Men's:  Janneman Malan Women's:  Fatima Sana
| previous     = 2019
| main         = ICC Awards
| next         = 2022
}}

The 2021 ICC Awards were the seventeenth edition of ICC Awards. The nominations took into account players' performance between 1 January 2021 and 31 December 2021. The announcement of the ICC World XI Teams were made on 19 and 20 January 2022. The women's awards were announced on 23 January 2022. The winners of the men's individual ICC'' awards and ICC Umpire of the year award were announced on 24 January 2022, with the Spirit of cricket award was announced on 2 February 2022.

Winners and nominees
The shortlists of the nominations for individual award categories were announced from 28 to 31 December 2021.

Individual awards

Men's awards

Women's awards

Other awards

ICC Teams of the Year

Men's teams

ICC Men's Test Team of the Year

 ICC Men's ODI Team of the Year

 ICC Men's t20i Team of the Year

Women's teams

 ICC Women's ODI Team of the Year

 ICC Women's T20I Team of the Year

Selection Committee
The nominees were shortlisted by the Awards panel, comprising prominent cricket journalists and broadcasters from across the globe along with Geoff Allardice, the ICC's CEO. The Voting Academy, comprising a wider selection of global cricket journalists and broadcasters, voted for their first, second and third choices for each category. The ICC also took into consideration fans’ votes via ICC's digital channels. The result of the Voting Academy selections and the fans’ vote were combined to determine the winner in each of the first seven categories.

References

International Cricket Council awards and rankings
Cricket
ICC Awards